Xerarionta kelletii, common name the Catalina cactus snail, is a species of air-breathing land snail, a terrestrial pulmonate gastropod mollusk in the family Helminthoglyptidae.

Anatomy

Snails in this species create and use love darts during mating.

The scanning electron microscope images on the left show (above) the lateral view of the love dart, scale bar 500 μm (0.5 mm); and (below) a cross section of the dart, scale bar 50 μm.

References
 

 A little info at 

Xerarionta
Gastropods described in 1850
Taxa named by Edward Forbes

pt:Xerarionta